Kani Kuchek (also Romanized as Kānī Kūchek and Kānī Kūchak; also known as Kānī Būchgaleh and Kāni Buch Qal ‘eh) is a village in Howmeh Rural District, in the Central District of Sanandaj County, Kurdistan Province, Iran. At the 2006 census, its population was 103, in 20 families. The village is populated by Kurds.

References 

Towns and villages in Sanandaj County
Kurdish settlements in Kurdistan Province